B. A. Wilson (born January 6, 1971) is an American former stock car racing driver. He competed in the Craftsman Truck Series from 1997–2000.

1997
Wilson made his debut in 1997, when he drove a personally-owned vehicle into the show at Richmond with a solid qualifying effort of 17th. He drove a smart race and came home with a 14th-place finish. Wilson qualified 17th in his other 1997 race, which came at Martinsville. However, transmission troubles sidelined him this time to 31st position.

1998
Wilson ran eight more races in 1998, continuing to run his family-owned No. 85 Llumar Chevy. Wilson did a respectable job, putting the truck in the top-20 in half of his outings. His best run would end up being a 14th place at Richmond. Wilson also qualified well, getting a pair of ninth place starting positions, at Martinsville and Nashville. Bad news for Wilson was that he also did not finish half of the races and he would have to work on that to improve his 36th place in the point rankings.

1999
Wilson did improve in 1999, finishing 32nd in points after another eight-race schedule. Wilson, though, did not really have his results improve on paper as he only finished three races. However, he did set his career best finish to that point (12th at Las Vegas and career best qualifying effort (7th at Martinsville). In the season finale, at California, Wilson switched to Sonntag Racing. He finished 28th.

2000
Wilson stayed with Sonntag for the full 2000 season, he was involved in the big one at Daytona in which Geoff Bodine had the horrific crash as well. competing in twenty-one of twenty-four races and finishing 21st in points. Wilson got his first career top-10 at Texas, where he finished ninth. He later matched that effort at Chicago Motor Speedway. Other highlights included a career best qualifying effort at Pikes Peak (5th), first laps led (at Mesa Marin – 14) and then later at Chicago Motor (7 laps). However, it was not enough to keep Wilson's job and he was released following the season finale. He has not raced in NASCAR since.

Motorsports career results

NASCAR
(key) (Bold – Pole position awarded by qualifying time. Italics – Pole position earned by points standings or practice time. * – Most laps led.)

Craftsman Truck Series

ARCA Hooters SuperCar Series
(key) (Bold – Pole position awarded by qualifying time. Italics – Pole position earned by points standings or practice time. * – Most laps led.)

References

External links
 

1971 births
Living people
People from Bonham, Texas
NASCAR drivers
ARCA Menards Series drivers
Racing drivers from Texas